Nestor is a fictional character in The Adventures of Tintin, the comics series by Belgian cartoonist Hergé. He is the long-suffering butler of Marlinspike Hall.

Nestor is the epitome of a butler (or, in French, majordome) of French society. Noble, loyal, always the domestic servant, Nestor serves his master Captain Haddock and any house guests such as Tintin, Professor Calculus, or Bianca Castafiore.

Character history
Nestor made his first appearance in The Secret of the Unicorn. In this story, he dutifully serves as butler for the Bird brothers, Marlinspike Hall's original owners and the villains of the adventure. Tintin has been kidnapped by Max and G. Bird and locked in their cellar. When Tintin breaks out and attempts to contact his friends by the house telephone, Nestor enters the room and asks who he was. A scuffle ensues, during which Nestor loyally stands by his employers. By the end of the story when the Bird brothers' criminal activities are exposed, Nestor is cleared of any wrongdoing. All evidence at the Bird brothers' trial shows that Nestor was ignorant of their true agenda, while Tintin and Haddock reason that he cannot be judged for his previous masters' actions.

Nestor remains as the butler of Marlinspike Hall when Captain Haddock reclaims the property, Haddock regarding Nestor as part of the place. He continues to be a staple character in all of the subsequent Tintin stories set at the hall, loyally serving his friends Haddock and Tintin.

In The Castafiore Emerald, he is depicted as being stereotypically suspicious of gypsies.

Adaptations

Nestor appears in the 2011 film adaptation of The Adventures of Tintin: The Secret of the Unicorn as the butler of Sakharine. He is shown as good-hearted and even secretly aids Tintin by giving him a hint as to what the model ship contained. It is also hinted that he is displeased with his employer as he states that Sakharine does not pay him at all. At the end of the film he becomes Haddock's butler. The film also adds a detail that Nestor's ancestor was Sir Francis Haddock's first mate, indicating that his family has served the Captain's family for many years since.

See also
 List of The Adventures of Tintin characters
 List of fictional butlers

References

Tintin characters
Comics characters introduced in 1943
Fictional butlers
Fictional servants
Male characters in comics